Landman is a Dutch surname, meaning "country man", "farmer". Notable people with the surname include:

 Ada Louise Landman Huxtable (1921–2013), American architecture critic, niece of Isaac
 Andrès Landman (born 1976), Dutch marathon speed skater
 Chris Landman (born 1981), Dutch darts player
 Elani Landman (born 1993), South African squash player
 Emil Landman (born 1989), Dutch folk musician
 Fred Landman (born 1956), Dutch-born Israeli professor of semantics
 Isaac Landman (1880–1946), Russian-born American rabbi and anti-Zionist activist, uncle of Ada Louise
 Jonathan Landman (born 1952), American journalist 
Kerry Landman, Australian applied mathematician and philanthropist 
 Ligtoring Landman (born 1986), South African rugby player
 Nate Landman (born 1998), American football player
 Roy Landman (1914–1990), American singer known as "Snooky Lanson"
 Tanya Landman (born 1950), English author of children's and young adult books
 Uzi Landman (born 1944), American computational physicist
Wim Landman (1921–1975), Dutch football goalkeeper
 Yuri Landman (born 1973), Dutch artist and musical instrument maker

See also
 Landmann, German cognate surname
 Landsman, variant Dutch form

References

Dutch-language surnames
Occupational surnames

de:Landman
ru:Ландман